The 2010 Rally Bulgaria was the seventh round of the 2010 World Rally Championship season. The rally took place over July 9–11, and was based in Borovets, around  outside the capital city, Sofia. The rally was also the third round of the Junior World Rally Championship.

Rally Bulgaria made its début in the World Rally Championship, having been approved to the calendar in September 2009. The event was won by Sébastien Loeb, who took his fourth win of the season, and the 58th of his WRC career. Loeb was part of a 1-2-3-4 by Citroën cars, as team-mate Dani Sordo finished second, Petter Solberg finished third in his privately run car and Sébastien Ogier was fourth in a car run by the Citroën Junior Team; the first such result by any manufacturer since 1993.


Results

Event standings

Special stages

Standings after the rally

Drivers' Championship standings

Manufacturers' Championship standings

References

External links 
 Results at eWRC.com

Bulgaria
Rally Bulgaria
Rally Bulgaria